Jeffrey Butland (December 7, 1950 - August 1, 2004) was an American politician from Maine. A Republican, Butland spent 8 years split between the Maine House of Representatives and the Maine Senate. represented (District 26 Cumberland County). He was also local officeholder in the town of Cumberland, Maine.

Upon his election as President of the 117th Maine Senate in December 1994,  Butland became the first Republican in that position since 1982. He was sworn in by Republican Governor John McKernan on December 7, 1994. Butland was appointed the New England administrator of the Small Business Administration in 2002 by President George W. Bush.

Personal
Butland was born in Portland, Maine and lived in there until the age of 13, when his family moved to Cumberland. He graduated from Bates College. He served four years in the United States Marine Corps and 22 years as a reservist. He died of a heart attack at age 53 on August 1, 2004.

References

1950 births
2004 deaths
Politicians from Portland, Maine
People from Cumberland, Maine
Bates College alumni
United States Marines
Maine city council members
Republican Party members of the Maine House of Representatives
Presidents of the Maine Senate
Republican Party Maine state senators
20th-century American politicians